Fudbalski klub BSK Banja Luka is a Bosnian-Herzegovinian football club based in Banja Luka, Bosnia and Herzegovina. They played the 2020-21 season in the 4th tier-Regional League RS - West.

BSK stands for Banjalučki sportski klub meaning "Sports Society of Banja Luka".

History
Since the formation of the Bosnia and Herzegovina leagues, the club has spent most seasons in the second and third tiers of the football pyramid. From 2003 through 2006 they were named BSK Crni Đorđe and from 2006 through 2008 they were named BSK Nektar.

Club seasons

References

External sources
 Club at BiHsoccer.

Football clubs in Republika Srpska
Football clubs in Bosnia and Herzegovina
Sport in Banja Luka
Association football clubs established in 1932
1932 establishments in Bosnia and Herzegovina